The Foot Fist Way is a 2006 American low-budget martial arts black comedy film directed by Jody Hill and starring Danny McBride. The film was produced by Gary Sanchez Productions that picked up distribution rights to the film and hoped for it to achieve a Napoleon Dynamite-like success. It premiered in 2006 at the Los Angeles Film Festival and at Sundance.

Plot
Fred Simmons (Danny McBride) is a fourth-degree black belt in Taekwondo who runs his own dojang in a small North Carolina town. He styles himself a big shot, driving a Ferrari and extolling the virtues of Taekwondo to potential new students, but loses his confidence after he discovers that his wife, Suzie (Mary Jane Bostic) gave her boss a handjob after a drunken office party. In order to restore his confidence, he attends a martial arts expo.  He meets his idol, B movie action star Chuck "the Truck" Wallace (Ben Best), who in reality turns out to be a dirty and drunken mess. After nearly brawling with Chuck's seedy friends, Fred persuades Chuck to make an appearance at his upcoming Taekwondo belt test and then parties with his friends and students in Chuck's hotel room. Fred returns home and sells his Ferrari to pay Chuck's $10,000 appearance fee. Shortly thereafter, Suzie returns to Fred after losing her job. On the night before the belt test, Fred catches Suzie having sex with Chuck on his own couch. Fred challenges Chuck to a fight, but is eventually beaten and driven off. The next morning, Suzie once again asks to be taken back, but Fred rejects her and urinates on his wedding ring. Fred arrives at the test late, battered and bruised, but with his confidence restored. When Chuck arrives for his appearance, Fred challenges him to a martial arts demonstration of board breaking, which he wins. At the following belt ceremony, Fred reads a new student pledge that he has written, which outlines the goals and responsibilities of Taekwondo.

Cast
 Danny McBride as Fred Simmons, a black belt and instructor of Taekwondo in a small southern town.
 Ben Best as Chuck "The Truck" Wallace, a B movie action star. Best is also a member of the music band Pyramid, who supplied songs to the film's soundtrack. Other members of the band played bit parts as Chuck's friends at his party.
 Mary Jane Bostic as Suzie Simmons, Fred's unfaithful, spandex-clad wife.
 Spencer Moreno as Julio, Fred's overweight adolescent second-in-command at the dojang.
 Carlos Lopez IV as Henry, a meek youth who finds self-confidence through Taekwondo.
 Jody Hill as Mike McAlister, Fred's intense friend and fellow Taekwondo black belt.
 Collette Wolfe as Denise
 Jonathan M Ewart as Charles

All martial artists in the film, excluding McBride and Best, were played by true Taekwondo practitioners, many from Concord Taekwondo in Concord, North Carolina.

Promotion
On February 26, 2008, McBride appeared as Fred Simmons in Late Night with Conan O'Brien. Many viewers were unfamiliar with either Fred or McBride and as a result there was initially much speculation as to whether the seemingly disastrous Tae Kwon Do demonstration, during which Fred asked for a "redo" after a failed block-splitting attempt and awkward interview, during which he repeatedly lashed out at fellow guest Will Ferrell for dancing around in a sexual nature during his interview segment earlier, were real or staged. Among the only immediate clues to suggest the interview was a setup was when the website for the film was flashed onscreen during the interview.

Critical response
The Foot Fist Way received mixed reviews from critics. On Rotten Tomatoes, the film has a 54% approval rating, based on 84 reviews, with an average rating of 5.5/10. The site's critical consensus reads, "The rough edges and biting humor of this martial arts comedy will keep audiences laughing and cringing in turns." On Metacritic, the film has a score of 63 out of 100, based on 22 critics, indicating "generally favorable reviews."

John Anderson of Variety gave the film a fairly positive review, stating that the film is "crying out to be discovered by midnight movie mavens".

Home media
The film was released on DVD in 2008.

References

External links
 
 
 
 
 
 

2006 films
2006 black comedy films
American black comedy films
2000s English-language films
Films directed by Jody Hill
Films shot in North Carolina
Gary Sanchez Productions films
2000s martial arts comedy films
American martial arts comedy films
MTV Films films
Paramount Vantage films
Taekwondo films
2006 martial arts films
2006 directorial debut films
2006 comedy films
2000s American films